

542001–542100 

|-id=026
| 542026 Kaszásattila ||  || Attila Kaszás (1960–2007) was a Slovak-born Hungarian actor and singer. || 
|}

542101–542200 

|-bgcolor=#f2f2f2
| colspan=4 align=center | 
|}

542201–542300 

|-id=246
| 542246 Kulcsár ||  || Győző Kulcsár (1940–2018) was a Hungarian fencer and fencing coach who won several gold medals in the men's team épée events at the 1964, 1968, and 1972 Olympic Games. || 
|}

542301–542400 

|-bgcolor=#f2f2f2
| colspan=4 align=center | 
|}

542401–542500 

|-id=461
| 542461 Slovinský ||  || Tomáš Slovinský (born 1994) is a Slovak astrophotographer and popularizer of astronomy using a portable planetarium. || 
|}

542501–542600 

|-id=561
| 542561 Ritajochen ||  || Rita Jahn (1932–2015) and Jochen Jahn (1932–2017), parents of German amateur astronomer Jost Jahn, who discovered this minor planet. || 
|-id=600
| 542600 Lindahall ||  || The Linda Hall Library of Science, Engineering and Technology in Kansas City, Missouri, is one of the largest science libraries in the world. || 
|}

542601–542700 

|-bgcolor=#f2f2f2
| colspan=4 align=center | 
|}

542701–542800 

|-bgcolor=#f2f2f2
| colspan=4 align=center | 
|}

542801–542900 

|-id=888
| 542888 Confino ||  || Bastien Confino (born 1978), a French-Swiss amateur astronomer and a radio reporter for Radio Télévision Suisse. || 
|}

542901–543000 

|-id=926
| 542926 Manteca ||  || José Manteca (born 1959), a Spanish astronomer and discoverer of minor planets, who is the director of the Begues Observatory in Barcelona. || 
|}

References 

542001-543000